Pseustes was a genus of snakes of the family Colubridae.

Taxonomy
Jadin et al. (2013) reassigned all species of Pseustes to the genera Phrynonax and Spilotes.

Species
Pseustes cinnamomeus  = Phrynonax sexcarinatus 
Pseustes poecilonotus  = Phrynonax poecilonotus 
Pseustes sexcarinatus  = Phrynonax sexcarinatus 
Pseustes shropshirei  = Phrynonax shropshirei 
Pseustes sulphureus  = Spilotes sulphureus

References

Further reading
Fitzinger L (1843). Systema Reptilium, Fasciculus Primus, Amblyglossae. Vienna: Braumüller & Seidel. 106 pp. + indices. (Pseustes, new genus, p. 27). (in Latin).
Jadin, Robert C; Burbrink, Frank T.; Rivas, Gilson A.; Vitt, Laurie J.; Barrio-Amorós, César L.; Guralnick, Robert P. (2013). "Finding arboreal snakes in an evolutionary tree: phylogenetic placement and systematic revision of the Neotropical birdsnakes". Journal of Zoological Systematics and Evolutionary Research 52 (3): 257-264.

Pseustes
Snake genera